Giving What We Can (GWWC) is an effective altruism-associated organisation whose members pledge to give at least 10% of their income to effective charities. It was founded at Oxford University in 2009 by the philosopher Toby Ord, physician-in-training Bernadette Young (Ord's wife), and fellow philosopher William MacAskill.

History

Giving What We Can was founded as a giving society in 2009 by Toby Ord, an ethics researcher at Oxford, his wife Bernadette Young, a physician in training at the time, and fellow ethicist William MacAskill with the goal of encouraging people to give 10% of their income on a regular basis to alleviate world poverty. This is similar to zakat in Islam and Ma'aser kesafim (giving 10% of income) in Jewish tradition but Ord said there was no religious motivation behind it. Ord cited writings from Peter Singer and Thomas Pogge about one's moral duty to give to the poor as inspiration for starting the organisation, and personally planned to give away everything above about $28,000 a year, the median after-tax salary in the U.K. His focus was on effective giving, meaning that he emphasised donations to charities which saved a maximal amount of life per donation amount.
GWWC was launched with 23 members. People who joined signed a pledge to give away 10% of their income to any organisation they thought could best address poverty in the developing world, and could pledge more; there was no penalty for quitting. By the end of 2011 it had 177 members, mostly other academics, in five chapters including Oxford, Cambridge, Princeton, and Harvard. 

By November 2011, the organisation was providing its members regular reports on what charities were most effective at addressing poverty in the developing world, and at that time was recommending a tropical diseases group and a de-worming group that each worked in Africa. Ord relied in part on research conducted by GiveWell, and also used the concept of the quality-adjusted life-year to gauge effectiveness of charities.

In 2011, a sister organisation at Oxford lead by MacAskill and others called "High Impact Careers" was spun off from Giving What We Can.  This organisation encouraged people to pursue high-paying jobs so they could give more money away. High Impact Careers was soon renamed to 80,000 Hours. In 2012 the two organisations incorporated the Centre for Effective Altruism as a nonprofit to serve as an umbrella organisation.

In 2017, Giving What We Can stopped conducting original research but rather started to recommend to its members to follow the advice by charity evaluators such as GiveWell, Animal Charity Evaluators and Founders Pledge. Additionally, they recommend a list of individual charities that cover a wide range of causes including global poverty alleviation, animal welfare and the welfare of future generations.

Research 

Giving What We Can used to conduct research to determine which charities it would recommend for members and other people to support. It differed from other charity evaluators in terms of the importance given to metrics of charity performance. While evaluators such as Charity Navigator used the fraction of donations spent on program expenses versus administrative overhead as an important indicator, Giving What We Can solely focused on the cost-effectiveness of the charity's work. It believed that the variance in cost-effectiveness of charities arose largely due to the variance in the nature of the causes that the charities operate in, and therefore made evaluations across broad areas of work such as health, education, and emergency aid before comparing specific organisations. In practice, it recommended a selected few charities in the area of global health. Its work was therefore similar to that of GiveWell.

In 2017, the Centre for Effective Altruism stopped conducting original research into giving opportunities based on significant overlap with organisations like GiveWell and the Open Philanthropy Project.

Pledges 
The shared ground of all Giving What We Can members is that they have committed to providing at least 10% of their income by signing "The Pledge". Therefore, members often refer to themselves as "pledges".

The Pledge 
The pledge is a voluntary and non-legal commitment to donate 10% of one's income. This figure is the minimum percentage and was chosen because it has a good balance. It is a significant proportion of income, in recognition of the importance of the problem and the need for real action. But it is also within the reach of most people in the developed world. Some members decide to go further and commit to donating 20% or even 50%.

Some members decide to go even further and perform the "Further Pledge".

The Further Pledge 
Founder Toby Ord further pledged to donate anything he earned over £20,000 a year, based on his conviction that he could live comfortably and happily on this income. This level of commitment is called "The Further Pledge". The member defines a basic annual income that they expect to live on. All income above this level will be donated to effective measures. Co-founder Will MacAskill is also among those who have made a similar pledge.

Try Giving 
Because some people may be interested in GWWC but not yet ready to take the pledge, it is also possible to make a temporary commitment called "Try Giving". This involves making a commitment to donate at least 1% of one's income for a specified period of time.

Companies 
In 2020, GWWC launched the option for companies to also declare their commitment to donating to effective organizations. In this case, companies commit to donate at least 10% of their profits to effective charities.

Members 
By 2012 the group had 264 people from 17 countries. It surpassed 1,000 members in 2015 and 5,000 members in 2020.

Prominent members 

Since its inception in 2009 the Giving What We Can Pledge was signed by various prominent individuals, mostly academics:

 Sam Bankman-Friedco-founder of crypto-companies FTX and Alameda Research
 Aviva BaumannAmerican actress
 Ken BaumannAmerican actor, writer, publisher and book designer
 Jonathan BlowAmerican video game designer, programmer and Twitch streamer
 Liv Boereetelevision presenter and former professional poker player
 John BohannonAmerican science journalist and scientist who is director of science at Primer, an artificial intelligence company
 Rutger BregmanDutch popular historian and author of four books on history, philosophy, and economics, including Utopia for Realists
 Marcus DaniellOlympic tennis player from New Zealand with 5 ATP titles and founder of the organization High Impact Athletes
 Ben DeloBritish mathematician, computer programmer, and entrepreneur, co-founder of BitMEX
 Peter EckersleyAustralian computer scientist, computer security researcher and activist
 Nir Eyalprofessor of bioethics and director of the Center for Population–Level Bioethics at Rutgers University
 Alan Fenwickprofessor of tropical parasitology at the Imperial College London, Founder of the Schistosomiasis Control Initiative (SCI)
 Diana FleischmanAmerican evolutionary psychologist and senior lecturer at University of Portsmouth
 Bruce Friedrichexecutive director of The Good Food Institute, a non-profit that received donation funding from Y Combinator
 Clare GallagherAmerican ultrarunner
 Rachel Glennersterchief economist at the Department for International Development (DFID)
 José GonzálezSwedish indie folk singer-songwriter and guitarist
 Amelia GrayAmerican writer
 Michael GregerAmerican physician, author, and professional speaker on public health issues and advocate for plant-based diets
 Sam HarrisAmerican author, philosopher, neuroscientist, podcast host, and prominent atheist
 A. J. JacobsAmerican journalist, author, and lecturer best known for writing about his lifestyle experiments
 Michael Kremerholder of the Nobel Memorial Prize in Economics, professor in economics and public policy at the University of Chicago
 Ben LesterBritish recording artist and multi-instrumentalist
 William MacAskillassociate professor in philosophy at the University of Oxford
 Dylan MatthewsAmerican journalist, correspondent for Vox
 Toby Ordsenior research fellow at the University of Oxford's Future of Humanity Institute
 Derek Parfitsenior research fellow at the University of Oxford, visiting professor of philosophy at Harvard University, New York University, and Rutgers University
 Kelsey PiperAmerican journalist and staff writer at Vox
 Thomas PoggeLeitner Professor of Philosophy and International Affairs at Yale University, director of the Global Justice Program
 Leah PriceAmerican literary critic
 Janet Radcliffe Richardsprofessor of practical philosophy at the University of Oxford
 Romesh RanganathanEnglish actor, comedian and presenter
 Peter Singerprofessor of bioethics at Princeton University, and laureate professor at the Centre for Applied Philosophy and Public Ethics at the University of Melbourne
 Adam Swiftprofessor of political theory at University College London
 Pilvi TakalaFinnish award-winning performance artist
 Derek ThompsonAmerican journalist and staff writer at The Atlantic
 Eva VivaltCanadian economist, assistant professor of economics at the University of Toronto and the founder of research institute AidGrade

References

External links 
Giving What We Can

2009 establishments in England
Altruism
British review websites
Charities based in Oxfordshire
Charity review websites
Poverty-related organizations
Organizations established in 2009
Centre for Effective Altruism